Corhiza scotiae, the fine hydroid, is a delicate colonial hydroid in the family Halopterididae.

Description

Fine hydroids grow in colonies of long stems with fine brown to black branches. The colonies may grow up to 33 cm in height. The gonophores (reproductive bodies) look like small yellowish ovals, growing from the main stem of the colony.

Distribution
This colonial animal is found off the South African coast from Saldanha Bay to East London in 18-120m under water. It is endemic to this region.

Ecology
In this species, male and female forms live on separate colonies. Male gonophores are elongated and have blunt ends. Female gonophores bulge and have blunt lids.

References

Halopterididae
Endemic fauna of South Africa
Marine fauna of Africa
Animals described in 1907